Pish Hesar (also Romanized as Pīsh Ḩeşār) is a village in Gasht Rural District, in the Central District of Fuman County, Gilan Province, Iran. At the 2006 census, its population was 914, in 239 families.

References 

Populated places in Fuman County